Verve Forecast is a record label formed as a division of Verve Records to concentrate on pop, rock, and folk music.

Founding
Jerry Schoenbaum of Verve and  Moe Asch of Folkways created Verve Folkways in 1964 to take advantage of the popularity of folk music. To broaden the label's appeal, the named was changed from Verve Folkways to Verve Forecast in 1967. Schoenbaum was president of the label.

History
Schoenbaum left in 1969, and Verve Forecast was closed by its parent company, MGM, in 1970. After PolyGram bought MGM, the Verve Forecast catalog was incorporated into Polydor. The label was revived in the 1990s for smooth jazz releases by Chris Botti, Jeff Lorber, and Will Downing. When PolyGram merged with Universal, the imprint was deactivated and its roster was transferred to GRP. In 2004, Verve Forecast was revived again to replace Blue Thumb to handle acts outside of jazz.

Roster
Verve Forecast signed pop, rock, folk, and blues musicians such as The Blues Project, Caravan, James Cotton, Friend & Lover, Tim Hardin, Richie Havens, The Hombres, John Lee Hooker, Lightnin' Hopkins, Janis Ian, Jim and Jean, Lead Belly, Bob Lind, The New Lost City Ramblers, Laura Nyro, Odetta, Street, and Dave Van Ronk.

After 2004, the label included Blues Traveler, Jamie Cullum, Dion, Jesse Harris, Katharine McPhee, Mandy Moore, Susan Tedeschi, Teddy Thompson, and Lizz Wright.

References

External links
 Official site

 
1967 establishments in California
American record labels
Companies based in Santa Monica, California
Folk record labels
Labels distributed by Universal Music Group
Re-established companies
Record labels based in California
Record labels established in 1967
Record labels established in 2004
 
 
Verve Records labels